is a Japanese rower. He competed at the 1984 Summer Olympics and the 1988 Summer Olympics.

References

1963 births
Living people
Japanese male rowers
Olympic rowers of Japan
Rowers at the 1984 Summer Olympics
Rowers at the 1988 Summer Olympics
Place of birth missing (living people)
Asian Games medalists in rowing
Rowers at the 1986 Asian Games
Rowers at the 1990 Asian Games
Asian Games gold medalists for Japan
Asian Games silver medalists for Japan
Medalists at the 1986 Asian Games
Medalists at the 1990 Asian Games